Aparadhi may refer to:

 Aparadhi (1949 film), a Hindi-language film directed by Yeshwant Pethkar
 Aparadhi (1955 film), a Bengali-language film directed by Debaki Bose
 Aparadhi (1976 film), a Kannada-language film directed by Y. R. Swamy
 Aparadhi (1977 film), a Malayalam-language film directed by P. N. Sundaram
 Aparadhi (2009 film), a Bengali-language film directed by Subhash Sen

See also
 Apradhi (disambiguation)